Mark Ricker (born September 2, 1968) is an American art director and production designer. He was nominated for an Academy Award in the category Best Production Design for the film Ma Rainey's Black Bottom. Ricker has also been nominated for three Primetime Emmy Awards in the category Outstanding Art Direction and Outstanding Production Design for his work on the television programs Escape at Dannemora and Halston and on the television film You Don't Know Jack.

 Selected filmography 
 Ma Rainey's Black Bottom'' (2020; co-nominated with Karen O'Hara and Diana Stoughton)

References

External links 

Living people
1968 births
People from North Carolina
American art directors
American production designers